A humbucking pickup, humbucker, or double coil, is a type of guitar pickup that uses two wire coils to cancel out the noisy interference picked up by coil pickups. In addition to electric guitar pickups, humbucking coils are sometimes used in dynamic microphones to cancel electromagnetic hum. Humbuckers are one of the two main types of guitar pickup, the other being single coil.

History 

The "humbucking coil" was invented in 1934 by Electro-Voice, an American professional audio company based in South Bend, Indiana that Al Kahn and Lou Burroughs incorporated in 1930 for the purpose of manufacturing portable public address equipment, including microphones and loudspeakers.

The twin coiled guitar pickup invented by Arnold Lesti in 1935 is arranged as a humbucker, and the patent USRE20070 describes the noise cancellation and current summation principles of such a design. This "Electric Translating Device" employed the solenoid windings of the pickup to magnetize the steel strings by means of switching on a short D.C. charge before switching over to amplification.

In 1938, A.F. Knoblaugh invented a pickup for stringed instruments involving two stacked coils . This pickup was to be used in pianos, since he was working for Baldwin Piano at the time.

The 1939 April copy of Radio Craft Magazine shows how to construct a guitar pickup made with two identical coils wrapped around self-magnetized iron cores, where one is then flipped over to create a reverse-wound, reverse-polarity, humbucking orientation. The iron cores of these pickups were magnetized to have their north-south poles at the opposite ends of the core, rather than the now more common top-bottom orientation.

To overcome the hum problem for guitars, a humbucking pickup was invented by Seth Lover of Gibson under instruction of then-president Ted McCarty. About the same time, Ray Butts developed a similar pickup that was taken up by Gretsch guitars. Although Gibson's patent was filed almost two years before Gretsch's, Gibson's patent was issued four weeks after Gretsch's. Both patents describe a reverse-wound and reverse-polarity pair of coils.

A successful early humbucking pickup was the type which is nowadays known as the "PAF" (literally "Patent Applied For") invented by Seth Lover in 1955. Because of this, and because of its use on the Gibson Les Paul guitar, popularization of the humbucker is strongly associated with Gibson, although humbuckers had been used in many different guitar designs by many different manufacturers before. Rickenbacker offered dual coil pickups arranged in a humbucking pattern beginning in late 1953 but dropped the design in 1954 due to the perceived distorted sound, which had stronger mid-range presence.

The Gibson Les Paul was the first guitar to use humbuckers in substantial production. Over the following decades, variants of practically every important type of electric guitar have also been factory-equipped with humbuckers, even the types which are traditionally most associated with single-coil pickups, like Fender Stratocasters and Telecasters.
In particular, the replacement of the bridge pickup in a Stratocaster-type guitar with a humbucker, resulting in a pickup configuration noted as H-S-S (starting at bridge pickup: H for humbucker, S for single coil) has gained much popularity. Guitars in this configuration are sometimes referred to as "Fat Strats", because of the "fatter", "rounder" tone offered by the humbucking pickup, and are also closely related to the development of the "Superstrat" style of guitar.

Function 

In any magnetic pickup, a vibrating guitar string, magnetized by a fixed magnet within the pickup, induces an alternating voltage across its coil. However, wire coils also make excellent antennas and are therefore sensitive to electromagnetic interference caused by alternating magnetic fields from mains wiring (mains hum) and electrical appliances like transformers, motors, and computer screens, especially older CRT monitors. Guitar pickups reproduce this noise, which can be quite audible, sounding like a constant hum or buzz. This is most noticeable when using distortion, fuzz, compressors, or other effects which, by adding gain to low-level signals, reduce the signal-to-noise ratio and therefore amplify the unwanted interference relative to the signal from the strings.

Humbuckers work by pairing a coil that has the north poles of its magnets oriented "up" (toward the strings) with another coil alongside it with the south pole of its magnets oriented up. By connecting the coils together out of phase, the interference is significantly reduced via phase cancellation: the string signals from both coils add up instead of canceling, because the magnets are placed in opposite polarity. This dramatically improves the signal-to-noise ratio. The technique has something in common with what electrical engineers call "common-mode rejection", and is also found in the balanced lines used in audio equipment. By convention, humbucker coils are both wound counterclockwise. The coils can be connected in series or in parallel in order to achieve this hum-cancellation effect, but humbucker pickups tend to be connected in series because that doubles the signal of the strings while keeping the hum reduced.

Alternative designs

Mini-humbuckers 

Many solid-body guitars feature cavities only for single-coil pickups. Installing full-sized humbuckers in this type of guitar requires additional routing of the woodwork, and/or cutting of the pickguard if the instrument has one. If the process is not carefully done, the instrument's body and pickguard may be damaged. In many situations, to maintain the guitars aesthetics and/or functionality the process would not be carried out, to prevent the associated risk. As a result, many pickup manufacturers now produce humbucking pickups compacted into the size of a single coil. Many different kinds of mini-humbuckers are available from numerous manufacturers, and they produce a wide range of different tones. The most common design is very similar to a traditional humbucker.

Stacked coils 
As a concept Stacks are similar to side-by-side humbuckers since a stacked pickup uses anti-phase hum signals to cancel hum. The notion that Stacks offer the more subtle and delicate sound of a single coil, while still retaining the hum-cancellation properties of a humbucker is not at all accurate. Firstly, when one of the stacked coils has no magnets there is a great imbalance of inductance and the offset hum voltage renders hum cancellation ineffective, and secondly, since the stacked coils are magnetically coupled string signal is present in both coils and is canceled along with the hum signal. Most Stacks have rod magnets extending through the cores of both coils, but while this improves hum cancellation it causes a huge additional degradation of the resultant sound because of common-mode signal cancellation. Thus people often refer to these type of pickups as Crude Stacks, meaning lacking sophisticated design. 
Seymour Duncan is the most notable purveyor of crude Stacks and he gave them the name Stack. Duncan Stacks, as well as Fender's Noiseless pickups, have Alnico rod magnets that extend through both upper and lower coils. All Fender's noiseless however have a significantly improved design which produces a better quality Fender sound. Although it is not 100% authentic since guitar players find the attack envelope to lack the rapid 'snap' of good sounding Fender non noiseless pickups. DiMarzio's HS-1, HS-2 and HS-3 are examples of vertical humbuckers aka Stacks that have magnets only in the top coil. 
The sound of Crude Stacks bears little resemblance to Fender sound. There are many other brands of crude Stacks including EMG and Fishman Fluence, however both of those have active electronic circuits build in to artificially re-constitute the signal generated by the coils to resemble the intended advertised sound.

Rail humbuckers 
Another design known as the rail humbucker features a single magnetic component spanning across the entire string width of the instrument. These pickups look like a normal mini-humbucker, except without the typical dots corresponding to the magnetic pole-pieces. This is sometimes expanded into a normal-size "quadrail", or double humbucker, effectively combining 4 coils connected in series to produce an extremely high-output pickup. The Kent Armstrong "Motherbucker" is an example of such an overpowered pickup.

The same type of rails can also be found in a normal-size humbucker, however. Heavy metal guitarist Dimebag Darrell made heavy use of this type of pickup wired in the bridge position. These tend to also sound fuller and have a higher output and bass response than the single coil-size version. DiMarzio has designed and sold many such pickups.

Coil splitting and coil taps 
Some guitars which have humbucking pickups feature "coil splits", which allow the pickups to act as "pseudo-single" coils by either short-circuiting or bypassing one coil. The electrical circuit of the pickup is reduced to that of a true single coil so there is no hum canceling effect. Usually, this feature is activated using a miniature toggle switch or a DPDT push-pull switch mounted on a potentiometer. Some guitars (e.g., the Peavey T-60 and the Fender Classic Player Jaguar HH) make use of a variable coil split circuit that allows the guitarist to dial a variable amount of signal from the second coil, from purely single coil to full humbucker and everything in-between.

Another similar option is a series/parallel switch, which in one position causes the coils to be connected in parallel rather than in series. This retains the humbucker's noise-cancellation properties, and gives a sound closer to that of two single-coil pickups used together.

Coil splitting is often wrongly referred to as a "coil tapping". Coil taps are most commonly found on single coil pickups, and involve an extra hook-up wire being included during the manufacture of the pickup so the guitarist can choose to have all the windings of the pickup included in the circuit, for a fatter, higher output sound with more midrange; or switch the output to "Tap" into the windings at a point that is less than the full coil for a brighter, lower output, cleaner sound. For example: a full pickup coil may be 10,000 turns of wire and the "Tap" may be at 8000 turns. Because of the confusion between coil splits and coil taps—and the rareness of coil taps in general—it is difficult to find tappable single-coil pickups for sale. However, pickup manufacturer Seymour Duncan offers tapped versions of many of their Telecaster and Stratocaster pickups.

Note the split single coil bears little resemblance to popular single coil pickups such as those made by Fender and the P-90 made by Gibson.

Notable humbucker designs 
 Gibson "PAF" - Seth Lover's humbucker design
 Gretsch Filter'Tron Prototype – Ray Butts' first humbucker design
 Fender Wide Range – Fender's first humbucker design, also by Seth Lover
 Epiphone (and later Gibson) mini-humbucker – a smaller humbucker design with adjustable pole pieces. A Gibson design which reduced their standard humbucker to fit in Epiphones routed for the 1950s Epi "New York" pickup, they were later used most famously in the Gibson Les Paul Deluxe.
 Gibson Firebird pickup – inspired by the Epiphone pickup, and shares its basic dimensions, but is different in terms of design, appearance, and tone, using single blade pole pieces.
 Q-tuner – neodymium magnet humbuckers
 EMG Pickups – active pickups since 1976
 Seymour Duncan - by Seymour W. Duncan
 Converge-3 by Kinman Guitar Electrix

Other noise-reducing pickup designs 
While the original humbucker remains the most common noise-reducing pickup design, inventors have tried many other approaches to reducing noise in guitar pickups.

Combining two single-coil pickups 
Many instruments combine separate single-coil pickups in a hum reducing configuration by reversing the electrical phase of one of the pickups. This arrangement is similar to that of a humbucking pickup and effectively reduces noise. Examples of this include the Fender Jazz Bass, introduced in 1960, which has used a pair of single-coil pickups, one near the bridge and another one about halfway between the bridge and the neck—and many Stratocaster style guitars, which often have 3 pickups with the middle one reversed electrically and magnetically. The (usually) five-way selector switch provides two humbucking settings, using the reversed middle pickup in parallel with either the bridge or neck pickup.

If the pickups are wired in series instead of parallel, the resulting sound is close to that of a normal humbucker. It is even closer to a humbucker-type sound if you put the coils closer together.

Proprietary designs 

In 1957, Fender introduced a split pickup to its Precision Bass, where one coil is serving the E and A strings, and the other one the D and G strings. This configuration is often referred to as a "split coil" pickup, which should not be confused with the possibility of "coil-splitting" a regular humbucker as discussed above. Both coils see nearly identical extraneous electromagnetic disturbances, and since they are wired in humbucking fashion, can effectively cancel them. However, the majority of the sound signal of any single note will mostly be generated just by one of the coils, so that output level and tonal qualities are much closer to a regular single-coil pickup. The resulting "P-Style" pickup is usually regarded as the main ingredient of the "P-Bass" sound, and many variants of the design are being offered by many manufacturers. The concept was later developed into G&L's "Z-coil" pickup, which is used for standard guitars such as their Comanche model.

In 1985, Lace Music Products introduced the Lace Sensor pickup, which uses proprietary screened bobbins to reduce hum while preserving single-coil tone.

In the early 1980s DiMarzio introduced replacement pickups for Stratocaster and Telecaster guitars. These were of the stacked humbucker design, where the lower pickup coil functions solely to cancel hum.

The DiMarzio "Super Distortion" pickup, introduced in 1972, was the first after-market replacement guitar pickup. With its much-increased output compared to the humbuckers that came installed in guitars of the time, it became an instant favourite of many hard-rock guitarists, and it remains a popular choice for a pickup upgrade decades later.
The "Super Distortion" is noteworthy for its trademarked looks: two uncovered cream coloured bobbins. Other manufacturers were since limited to selling pickups with two black bobbins, or in the "zebra" look: with one bobbin black and one bobbin cream. (Of course, they were still free to use wilder colours, but only in rare cases is such a choice regarded as befitting the look of any serious professional instrument.)

See also 

 Pickup (music technology)
 Single coil guitar pickup
 Differential signaling

References

External links 

Science and measurements behind electro-magnetic guitar pickups

Guitar pickups
Electromagnetic components